Fujiwara no Kenshi (1057–1084) was the empress consort of Emperor Shirakawa of Japan.

She was a daughter of Minamoto Akifusa (源顕房), and adopted by Fujiwara no Morozane (藤原師実).

Issue

Imperial Prince Atsufumi (敦文親王; 1075–1077)
Imperial Princess Yasuko (媞子内親王) later Ikuhomon’in (郁芳門院)
Imperial Princess Reishi (令子内親王) saigū
Imperial Prince Taruhito (善仁親王) later Emperor Horikawa
Imperial Princess Shinshi (禛子内親王; 1081–1156)—Tsuchimikado Saiin (土御門斎院)

Notes

Fujiwara clan
Japanese empresses
1057 births
1084 deaths